Dan or Daniel Shea may refer to:

Dan Shea (actor) (born 1954), Canadian actor and stunt coordinator
Dan Shea (producer), American record producer and composer
Daniel J. Shea, American soldier
Daniel J. Shea (judge) (born 1938), former justice of the Montana Supreme Court